Colonial Hotel, also known as Colonial Apartments, is a historic hotel located at Excelsior Springs, Clay County, Missouri. It was built in 1924, and is a three-story, red brick building.  It features a three-tiered porch supported by four nearly full-height square brick columns.  The Colonial provided residential space for those visiting Excelsior Springs for an extended period of time in order to "take the waters" at the town's multiple mineral springs.

It was listed on the National Register of Historic Places in 2010.

References

Hotel buildings on the National Register of Historic Places in Missouri
Hotel buildings completed in 1924
Buildings and structures in Clay County, Missouri
National Register of Historic Places in Clay County, Missouri